Federico Bicoro Akieme Nchama (born 17 March 1996), known as Federico Bikoro, is a professional footballer who plays for Norwegian Eliteserien club Sandefjord and the Equatorial Guinea national team. Mainly a central midfielder, he can also play as a winger. Born in Cameroon, he plays for Equatorial Guinea at international level.

Early life
Bikoro was born in Douala, Cameroon to an Equatorial Guinean father and a Cameroonian mother. When he was 15, his parents died in a traffic accident. In order to help his family economically he decided to abandon his studies and his intention to be a lawyer. He worked as a mason and carpenter before finally becoming a footballer.

Club career
Bikoro began his career with Akonangui FC, where he was known as Sisinio. In 2015 he moved to Sony Elá Nguema, and played for the side in the CAF Champions League. He also played in the Cano Sport Academy.

In September 2016, after impressing on a trial basis, Bikoro agreed to a two-year contract with Spanish Segunda División B team Recreativo de Huelva. His deal could not be completed due to issues with his paperwork, and he instead signed for RSD Alcalá in Tercera División the following February.

On 18 August 2017, Bikoro joined UD San Sebastián de los Reyes in the third division. He scored his first goal for the club on 7 January of the following year, netting the equalizer in a 3–1 away win against SD Ponferradina.

On 31 January 2018, Bikoro signed for Lorca FC in Segunda División. He played his first professional match on 11 March, starting and being sent off in a 1–3 loss at Real Zaragoza.

On 24 July 2018, Bikoro joined CD Teruel in the third tier. The following 11 June, he agreed to a four-year deal with Zaragoza in division two, but was loaned to CD Badajoz on 16 January 2020.

On 4 September 2020, Bikoro agreed to a one-year loan deal with CD Numancia, recently relegated to the third division. The following 26 January, after appearing rarely, he moved to fellow league team CF Badalona also in a temporary deal. In July 2021 he moved on loan to Hércules.

International career
Bikoro made his international debut for Equatorial Guinea national team on 4 September 2013, appearing in a non-FIFA friendly against Libya, which ended in a 1–1 draw. His official debut for the side came on 6 June 2015, as he started in a 1–0 away win against Andorra.

Bikoro scored his first international goal on 9 October 2017, netting his team's second in a 3–1 home win against Mauritius.

International goals
Scores and results list Equatorial Guinea's goal tally first.

Playing style 
Bikoro is a high intensity midfielder.

Personal life
Bikoro is a devout Christian.

References

External links

1996 births
Living people
Footballers from Douala
Citizens of Equatorial Guinea through descent
Cameroonian people of Equatoguinean descent
Sportspeople of Equatoguinean descent
Equatoguinean people of Cameroonian descent
Equatoguinean footballers
Cameroonian footballers
Association football midfielders
Akonangui FC players
CD Elá Nguema players
Cano Sport Academy players
RSD Alcalá players
UD San Sebastián de los Reyes players
Lorca FC players
CD Teruel footballers
Real Zaragoza players
CD Badajoz players
CD Numancia players
CF Badalona players
Hércules CF players
Sandefjord Fotball players
Segunda División players
Segunda División B players
Tercera División players
Segunda Federación players
Equatorial Guinea international footballers
2021 Africa Cup of Nations players
Equatoguinean expatriate footballers
Cameroonian expatriate footballers
Cameroonian expatriate sportspeople in Spain
Equatoguinean expatriate sportspeople in Spain
Expatriate footballers in Spain
Cameroonian expatriate sportspeople in Norway
Equatoguinean expatriates in Norway
Expatriate footballers in Norway
Cameroonian Christians
Equatoguinean Christians